Chidiebube Gideon "Ebube" Duru  (born 31 July 1999) is a Nigerian footballer who plays as a left-back for Lobi Stars. His name is occasionally spelled in sources as Ebube Duru.

Career
Duru began his career at a grass youth club known as Rock Foundation F.C before moving to Benin Vipers, another grass youth club. On 24 January 2014, he signed for Dynamite Force F.C (amateur 2) in which he played the Nationwide League and was promoted to amateur 1 the following season. He was loaned to F.C. Ebedei (amateur 1), played for a season and was promoted to Pro league scoring a total of three goals. He returned to Dynamite force F.C. On 13 March 2016, Duru signed for Premier League club Lobi Stars Football Club on a three-year contract.

International career
Duru represented his homeland in the 2018 Friendly against Atletico Madrid which took place at Godswill Akpabio Stadium, Uyo on May 21.
 And the international friendly against Liberia which took place September 11, 2018, at the Samuel Keyon Doe Sports Complex in Paynesville. On 13 February 2018, he was called up to the Nigerian under-23 national team for the 2019 Africa Cup of Nations qualifier, he made the lineup and played against Libya.

References

External links
 
 Chidiebube Gideon Duru Profile at Mundail 11
 Five Super Eagles who could trouble Atletico Madrid at Goal.com

1999 births
Living people
Nigerian footballers
Association football fullbacks
Lobi Stars F.C. players
Sportspeople from Imo State